Chromodoris strigata, commonly known as the streaked chromodoris, is a species of colourful sea slug, a dorid nudibranch, a marine gastropod mollusc in the family Chromodorididae.

Distribution
This species occurs in the tropical Indo-West Pacific Ocean. It has been observed in localities as far apart as Madagascar in Africa to the Great Barrier Reef in Australia.

Description
Chromodoris strigata is pale blue with black longitudinal lines on its body and upper mantle. It has a bright orange-edged mantle and bright orange gills and rhinophores. This species is easily confused with Chromodoris elisabethina but has a distinctive darker area in the middle of the back.

Ecology
This species, like many other nudibranchs, feeds on sponges. It has been seen feeding on yellow sponges from the  family Darwinellidae.

References

External links
 

Chromodorididae
Gastropods described in 1982